Bannow was a constituency represented in the Irish House of Commons until its abolition on 1 January 1801.

Borough
This constituency was the parliamentary borough of Bannow in County Wexford.

History
In the Patriot Parliament of 1689 summoned by James II, Bannow was represented with two members. Following the Act of Union 1800 the borough was disenfranchised.

Members of Parliament
1634–1635: Pierce Neville and Walter Furlong (or Walter Stapleton) 
1639–1649: Christopher Hollywood (expelled 1642) and Gerald Cheevers (expelled 1642)
1661–1666: Dr Dudley Loftus and Henry Warren

1689–1801

Notes

References

Bibliography

 Johnston-Liik, E. M. (2002). History of the Irish Parliament, 1692–1800., Publisher: Ulster Historical Foundation (28 Feb 2002),  
T. W. Moody, F. X. Martin, F. J. Byrne, A New History of Ireland 1534-1691, Oxford University Press, 1978

Constituencies of the Parliament of Ireland (pre-1801)
Historic constituencies in County Wexford
1800 disestablishments in Ireland
Constituencies disestablished in 1800